Omar Athamneh is a Jordanian retired football player who played as a striker.

References
 Omar Athamneh Transfers to Al-Ramtha SC 
 Jordanian Khaled Saad and Omar Athamneh Take Proficiency in Salalah SC of Oman

External links
 
 

1983 births
Living people
Jordanian footballers
Jordan international footballers
Association football midfielders
Jordanian Pro League players
Oman Professional League players
Al-Ramtha SC players
Al-Hussein SC (Irbid) players
Al-Arabi (Jordan) players
Al-Sareeh SC players
Kufrsoum SC players
Salalah SC players
Jordanian expatriate footballers
Jordanian expatriate sportspeople in Oman
Expatriate footballers in Oman